The 2002–03 Buffalo Sabres season was the 33rd season of operation for the National Hockey League franchise that was established on May 22, 1970. The Sabres failed to qualify for the playoffs for a second consecutive season. The 72 points accumulated in the regular season was the lowest total for the franchise since the 1986–87 season.

Off-season

Regular season

Final standings

Schedule and results

|- align="center" bgcolor="#CCFFCC"
|1||W||October 10, 2002||5–1 || align="left"|  New York Islanders (2002–03) ||1–0–0–0 || 
|- align="center" bgcolor="#CCFFCC"
|2||W||October 12, 2002||6–1 || align="left"| @ Montreal Canadiens (2002–03) ||2–0–0–0 || 
|- align="center" bgcolor="#FFBBBB"
|3||L||October 13, 2002||0–3 || align="left"| @ Chicago Blackhawks (2002–03) ||2–1–0–0 || 
|- align="center"
|4||T||October 17, 2002||4–4 OT|| align="left"|  New York Rangers (2002–03) ||2–1–1–0 || 
|- align="center" bgcolor="#FFBBBB"
|5||L||October 19, 2002||2–3 || align="left"|  Phoenix Coyotes (2002–03) ||2–2–1–0 || 
|- align="center" bgcolor="#CCFFCC"
|6||W||October 22, 2002||2–1 || align="left"|  Philadelphia Flyers (2002–03) ||3–2–1–0 || 
|- align="center" bgcolor="#FFBBBB"
|7||L||October 25, 2002||1–2 || align="left"|  New Jersey Devils (2002–03) ||3–3–1–0 || 
|- align="center" bgcolor="#FFBBBB"
|8||L||October 26, 2002||2–5 || align="left"| @ Pittsburgh Penguins (2002–03) ||3–4–1–0 || 
|- align="center"
|9||T||October 29, 2002||1–1 OT|| align="left"| @ Vancouver Canucks (2002–03) ||3–4–2–0 || 
|- align="center" bgcolor="#FFBBBB"
|10||L||October 31, 2002||0–3 || align="left"| @ Calgary Flames (2002–03) ||3–5–2–0 || 
|-

|- align="center"
|11||T||November 1, 2002||1–1 OT|| align="left"| @ Edmonton Oilers (2002–03) ||3–5–3–0 || 
|- align="center" bgcolor="#FFBBBB"
|12||L||November 3, 2002||2–3 || align="left"| @ Columbus Blue Jackets (2002–03) ||3–6–3–0 || 
|- align="center" bgcolor="#FFBBBB"
|13||L||November 7, 2002||0–2 || align="left"| @ Carolina Hurricanes (2002–03) ||3–7–3–0 || 
|- align="center" bgcolor="#FFBBBB"
|14||L||November 9, 2002||4–6 || align="left"|  Atlanta Thrashers (2002–03) ||3–8–3–0 || 
|- align="center" bgcolor="#FFBBBB"
|15||L||November 12, 2002||3–4 || align="left"|  Boston Bruins (2002–03) ||3–9–3–0 || 
|- align="center" bgcolor="#FFBBBB"
|16||L||November 15, 2002||2–3 || align="left"|  Toronto Maple Leafs (2002–03) ||3–10–3–0 || 
|- align="center" bgcolor="#FFBBBB"
|17||L||November 16, 2002||1–4 || align="left"| @ Ottawa Senators (2002–03) ||3–11–3–0 || 
|- align="center" bgcolor="#FF6F6F"
|18||OTL||November 19, 2002||3–4 OT|| align="left"| @ New Jersey Devils (2002–03) ||3–11–3–1 || 
|- align="center" bgcolor="#CCFFCC"
|19||W||November 22, 2002||5–4 || align="left"|  Columbus Blue Jackets (2002–03) ||4–11–3–1 || 
|- align="center" bgcolor="#FFBBBB"
|20||L||November 23, 2002||1–4 || align="left"| @ Boston Bruins (2002–03) ||4–12–3–1 || 
|- align="center"
|21||T||November 27, 2002||1–1 OT|| align="left"|  Tampa Bay Lightning (2002–03) ||4–12–4–1 || 
|- align="center" bgcolor="#FFBBBB"
|22||L||November 29, 2002||1–4 || align="left"|  Pittsburgh Penguins (2002–03) ||4–13–4–1 || 
|- align="center" bgcolor="#FFBBBB"
|23||L||November 30, 2002||1–3 || align="left"| @ Toronto Maple Leafs (2002–03) ||4–14–4–1 || 
|-

|- align="center" bgcolor="#CCFFCC"
|24||W||December 4, 2002||4–0 || align="left"|  Mighty Ducks of Anaheim (2002–03) ||5–14–4–1 || 
|- align="center" bgcolor="#CCFFCC"
|25||W||December 6, 2002||4–1 || align="left"| @ New York Rangers (2002–03) ||6–14–4–1 || 
|- align="center" bgcolor="#CCFFCC"
|26||W||December 7, 2002||4–3 || align="left"|  Washington Capitals (2002–03) ||7–14–4–1 || 
|- align="center" bgcolor="#FFBBBB"
|27||L||December 10, 2002||2–4 || align="left"|  Ottawa Senators (2002–03) ||7–15–4–1 || 
|- align="center"
|28||T||December 13, 2002||1–1 OT|| align="left"|  Chicago Blackhawks (2002–03) ||7–15–5–1 || 
|- align="center" bgcolor="#FFBBBB"
|29||L||December 14, 2002||0–2 || align="left"| @ Philadelphia Flyers (2002–03) ||7–16–5–1 || 
|- align="center" bgcolor="#CCFFCC"
|30||W||December 18, 2002||4–2 || align="left"|  Boston Bruins (2002–03) ||8–16–5–1 || 
|- align="center" bgcolor="#FFBBBB"
|31||L||December 20, 2002||0–3 || align="left"|  Florida Panthers (2002–03) ||8–17–5–1 || 
|- align="center" bgcolor="#FFBBBB"
|32||L||December 21, 2002||2–6 || align="left"| @ Montreal Canadiens (2002–03) ||8–18–5–1 || 
|- align="center" bgcolor="#FFBBBB"
|33||L||December 23, 2002||2–5 || align="left"| @ Pittsburgh Penguins (2002–03) ||8–19–5–1 || 
|- align="center" bgcolor="#FFBBBB"
|34||L||December 26, 2002||2–3 || align="left"|  Ottawa Senators (2002–03) ||8–20–5–1 || 
|- align="center" bgcolor="#FFBBBB"
|35||L||December 28, 2002||3–4 || align="left"|  Minnesota Wild (2002–03) ||8–21–5–1 || 
|- align="center" bgcolor="#FFBBBB"
|36||L||December 30, 2002||3–4 || align="left"| @ Washington Capitals (2002–03) ||8–22–5–1 || 
|- align="center" bgcolor="#FF6F6F"
|37||OTL||December 31, 2002||0–1 OT|| align="left"|  New York Islanders (2002–03) ||8–22–5–2 || 
|-

|- align="center" bgcolor="#CCFFCC"
|38||W||January 3, 2003||6–3 || align="left"|  Carolina Hurricanes (2002–03) ||9–22–5–2 || 
|- align="center" bgcolor="#CCFFCC"
|39||W||January 4, 2003||2–1 OT|| align="left"| @ Ottawa Senators (2002–03) ||10–22–5–2 || 
|- align="center" bgcolor="#FFBBBB"
|40||L||January 7, 2003||2–3 || align="left"| @ Philadelphia Flyers (2002–03) ||10–23–5–2 || 
|- align="center" bgcolor="#CCFFCC"
|41||W||January 10, 2003||4–2 || align="left"|  Boston Bruins (2002–03) ||11–23–5–2 || 
|- align="center" bgcolor="#CCFFCC"
|42||W||January 11, 2003||3–2 || align="left"| @ Montreal Canadiens (2002–03) ||12–23–5–2 || 
|- align="center" bgcolor="#CCFFCC"
|43||W||January 14, 2003||1–0 || align="left"| @ Minnesota Wild (2002–03) ||13–23–5–2 || 
|- align="center"
|44||T||January 16, 2003||2–2 OT|| align="left"| @ San Jose Sharks (2002–03) ||13–23–6–2 || 
|- align="center" bgcolor="#CCFFCC"
|45||W||January 18, 2003||1–0 || align="left"| @ Phoenix Coyotes (2002–03) ||14–23–6–2 || 
|- align="center"
|46||T||January 21, 2003||0–0 OT|| align="left"|  Pittsburgh Penguins (2002–03) ||14–23–7–2 || 
|- align="center" bgcolor="#CCFFCC"
|47||W||January 24, 2003||4–0 || align="left"|  Toronto Maple Leafs (2002–03) ||15–23–7–2 || 
|- align="center" bgcolor="#FF6F6F"
|48||OTL||January 25, 2003||3–4 OT|| align="left"| @ Ottawa Senators (2002–03) ||15–23–7–3 || 
|- align="center" bgcolor="#FFBBBB"
|49||L||January 27, 2003||1–5 || align="left"|  Nashville Predators (2002–03) ||15–24–7–3 || 
|- align="center" bgcolor="#FF6F6F"
|50||OTL||January 30, 2003||1–2 OT|| align="left"| @ St. Louis Blues (2002–03) ||15–24–7–4 || 
|-

|- align="center" bgcolor="#FFBBBB"
|51||L||February 4, 2003||1–4 || align="left"| @ New Jersey Devils (2002–03) ||15–25–7–4 || 
|- align="center" bgcolor="#FFBBBB"
|52||L||February 7, 2003||2–4 || align="left"|  Vancouver Canucks (2002–03) ||15–26–7–4 || 
|- align="center" bgcolor="#FFBBBB"
|53||L||February 8, 2003||1–3 || align="left"| @ New York Islanders (2002–03) ||15–27–7–4 || 
|- align="center" bgcolor="#FFBBBB"
|54||L||February 11, 2003||2–3 || align="left"|  St. Louis Blues (2002–03) ||15–28–7–4 || 
|- align="center" bgcolor="#FFBBBB"
|55||L||February 13, 2003||2–4 || align="left"| @ Detroit Red Wings (2002–03) ||15–29–7–4 || 
|- align="center" bgcolor="#CCFFCC"
|56||W||February 15, 2003||5–4 || align="left"|  New York Rangers (2002–03) ||16–29–7–4 || 
|- align="center" bgcolor="#FF6F6F"
|57||OTL||February 17, 2003||3–4 OT|| align="left"| @ Atlanta Thrashers (2002–03) ||16–29–7–5 || 
|- align="center" bgcolor="#CCFFCC"
|58||W||February 19, 2003||2–1 OT|| align="left"|  Montreal Canadiens (2002–03) ||17–29–7–5 || 
|- align="center" bgcolor="#FFBBBB"
|59||L||February 21, 2003||1–4 || align="left"|  Los Angeles Kings (2002–03) ||17–30–7–5 || 
|- align="center" bgcolor="#CCFFCC"
|60||W||February 23, 2003||4–1 || align="left"| @ Tampa Bay Lightning (2002–03) ||18–30–7–5 || 
|- align="center"
|61||T||February 24, 2003||2–2 OT|| align="left"| @ Florida Panthers (2002–03) ||18–30–8–5 || 
|- align="center" bgcolor="#FFBBBB"
|62||L||February 26, 2003||2–3 || align="left"| @ Washington Capitals (2002–03) ||18–31–8–5 || 
|- align="center" bgcolor="#CCFFCC"
|63||W||February 28, 2003||5–3 || align="left"|  Dallas Stars (2002–03) ||19–31–8–5 || 
|-

|- align="center" bgcolor="#FF6F6F"
|64||OTL||March 1, 2003||1–2 OT|| align="left"| @ New York Islanders (2002–03) ||19–31–8–6 || 
|- align="center" bgcolor="#FFBBBB"
|65||L||March 4, 2003||1–2 || align="left"|  Washington Capitals (2002–03) ||19–32–8–6 || 
|- align="center" bgcolor="#CCFFCC"
|66||W||March 6, 2003||4–2 || align="left"|  Toronto Maple Leafs (2002–03) ||20–32–8–6 || 
|- align="center" bgcolor="#CCFFCC"
|67||W||March 8, 2003||4–0 || align="left"| @ Florida Panthers (2002–03) ||21–32–8–6 || 
|- align="center"
|68||T||March 9, 2003||1–1 OT|| align="left"| @ Tampa Bay Lightning (2002–03) ||21–32–9–6 || 
|- align="center" bgcolor="#FF6F6F"
|69||OTL||March 12, 2003||2–3 OT|| align="left"|  Carolina Hurricanes (2002–03) ||21–32–9–7 || 
|- align="center" bgcolor="#FFBBBB"
|70||L||March 14, 2003||2–4 || align="left"|  Tampa Bay Lightning (2002–03) ||21–33–9–7 || 
|- align="center" bgcolor="#FFBBBB"
|71||L||March 15, 2003||3–5 || align="left"| @ Atlanta Thrashers (2002–03) ||21–34–9–7 || 
|- align="center" bgcolor="#CCFFCC"
|72||W||March 18, 2003||5–2 || align="left"|  Philadelphia Flyers (2002–03) ||22–34–9–7 || 
|- align="center" bgcolor="#FFBBBB"
|73||L||March 19, 2003||0–3 || align="left"| @ New York Rangers (2002–03) ||22–35–9–7 || 
|- align="center" bgcolor="#FF6F6F"
|74||OTL||March 22, 2003||2–3 OT|| align="left"| @ Toronto Maple Leafs (2002–03) ||22–35–9–8 || 
|- align="center" bgcolor="#CCFFCC"
|75||W||March 24, 2003||4–3 OT|| align="left"|  Colorado Avalanche (2002–03) ||23–35–9–8 || 
|- align="center" bgcolor="#CCFFCC"
|76||W||March 26, 2003||2–1 || align="left"|  Florida Panthers (2002–03) ||24–35–9–8 || 
|- align="center" bgcolor="#CCFFCC"
|77||W||March 28, 2003||4–1 || align="left"|  Montreal Canadiens (2002–03) ||25–35–9–8 || 
|- align="center" bgcolor="#CCFFCC"
|78||W||March 29, 2003||3–1 || align="left"| @ Carolina Hurricanes (2002–03) ||26–35–9–8 || 
|- align="center" bgcolor="#FFBBBB"
|79||L||March 31, 2003||0–3 || align="left"| @ Dallas Stars (2002–03) ||26–36–9–8 || 
|-

|- align="center" bgcolor="#CCFFCC"
|80||W||April 2, 2003||4–3 || align="left"|  Atlanta Thrashers (2002–03) ||27–36–9–8 || 
|- align="center" bgcolor="#FFBBBB"
|81||L||April 5, 2003||5–8 || align="left"| @ Boston Bruins (2002–03) ||27–37–9–8 || 
|- align="center"
|82||T||April 6, 2003||2–2 OT|| align="left"|  New Jersey Devils (2002–03) ||27–37–10–8 || 
|-

|-
| Legend:

Player statistics

Scoring
 Position abbreviations: C = Center; D = Defense; G = Goaltender; LW = Left Wing; RW = Right Wing
  = Joined team via a transaction (e.g., trade, waivers, signing) during the season. Stats reflect time with the Sabres only.
  = Left team via a transaction (e.g., trade, waivers, release) during the season. Stats reflect time with the Sabres only.

Goaltending

Awards and records

Awards

Transactions
The Sabres were involved in the following transactions from June 14, 2002, the day after the deciding game of the 2002 Stanley Cup Finals, through June 9, 2003, the day of the deciding game of the 2003 Stanley Cup Finals.

Trades

Players acquired

Players lost

Signings

Draft picks
Buffalo's draft picks at the 2002 NHL Entry Draft held at the Air Canada Centre in Toronto, Ontario.

See also
 2002–03 NHL season

Notes

References

Buff
Buff
Buffalo Sabres seasons
Buffalo
Buffalo